Goshen Township is one of the twenty-two townships of Tuscarawas County, Ohio, United States.  The 2000 census found 5,285 people in the township, 4,225 of whom lived in the unincorporated portions of the township.

Geography
Located in the east central part of the county, it borders the following townships:
Fairfield Township - north
Warren Township - northeast
Union Township - east
Mill Township - southeast
Warwick Township - south
York Township - southwest
Dover Township - northwest

Several municipalities are located in Goshen Township:
The city of New Philadelphia, the county seat of Tuscarawas County, in the center and northwest
Part of the village of Barnhill, in the southeast
Part of the village of Midvale, in the southeast
Part of the village of Roswell, in the east

Name and history
Goshen Township is named after the Land of Goshen, whose name was meant to imply fertility of the soil. It is one of seven Goshen Townships statewide. The township was established in 1808.

Within the township's boundaries is the old village of Goshen which was one of the settlements of the Christian Munsee.

Government
The township is governed by a three-member board of trustees, who are elected in November of odd-numbered years to a four-year term beginning on the following January 1. Two are elected in the year after the presidential election and one is elected in the year before it. There is also an elected township fiscal officer, who serves a four-year term beginning on April 1 of the year after the election, which is held in November of the year before the presidential election. Vacancies in the fiscal officership or on the board of trustees are filled by the remaining trustees.  The current trustees are Bob Hausermann, Lisa Allen, and Dan Hodges, and the fiscal officer is Laura Engled.

References

External links
County website

1808 establishments in Ohio
Townships in Tuscarawas County, Ohio
Populated places established in 1808
Townships in Ohio